Michel Barbosa de Lima (born 12 May 1997), commonly known as Michel, is a Brazilian footballer who plays as a midfielder for Oliveirense.

Career statistics

Club

References

1997 births
Living people
Brazilian footballers
Brazilian expatriate footballers
Association football midfielders
Campeonato Brasileiro Série D players
Liga Portugal 2 players
Fluminense FC players
CR Flamengo footballers
Criciúma Esporte Clube players
Bangu Atlético Clube players
Boavista Sport Club players
U.D. Oliveirense players
Brazilian expatriate sportspeople in Portugal
Expatriate footballers in Portugal
Footballers from Rio de Janeiro (city)